Bracut (formerly, Brainard) is an unincorporated community in Humboldt County, California. The name originated as a contraction of the railway cut through Brainard hill in the Humboldt Bay salt marsh. Railway trestle work originally connected the hill south to Eureka and north to Arcata. Much of the hill was subsequently excavated to provide fill to replace the original trestle work; and the railway fill prism became a dike encouraging conversion of the inland salt marsh to pasture land. The leveled hill is now the site of several large structures remaining from previous lumber operations, a District 1 CalTrans yard, and a KOA campground.

References

Unincorporated communities in Humboldt County, California
Unincorporated communities in California
Populated coastal places in California